Palestro is an underground station on Line 1 of the Milan Metro. It was opened on 1 November 1964 as part of the inaugural section of the Metro, between Sesto Marelli and Lotto.

The station is located on Corso Venezia, near the junction with Via Palestro, within the city centre of Milan just outside the core area. It is near the Civic Museum of Natural History.

References

Line 1 (Milan Metro) stations
Railway stations opened in 1964
1964 establishments in Italy
Railway stations in Italy opened in the 20th century